Noel Owen Neal House, also known as Grace Fisher House, built in 1840, is a historic squared-log dogtrot house in Washington, Arkansas.  Originally located at 184 Blue Bayou Road South in Nashville, Arkansas, it had been listed National Register of Historic Places. The Historic Preservation Alliance of Arkansas listed it as one of its Most Endangered Places in 2005.

The house was removed from the National Register on January 26, 2006.  This followed its relocation to Washington and the replacement of its roof, porches, and chimneys during restoration.

References

Houses completed in 1840
Houses in Howard County, Arkansas
Former National Register of Historic Places in Arkansas
Houses on the National Register of Historic Places in Arkansas
Dogtrot architecture in Arkansas
National Register of Historic Places in Howard County, Arkansas
1840 establishments in Arkansas
Houses in Hempstead County, Arkansas
Relocated buildings and structures in Arkansas
Nashville, Arkansas